List of the National Register of Historic Places listings in Lewis County, New York

This is intended to be a complete list of properties and districts listed on the National Register of Historic Places in Lewis County, New York.  The locations of National Register properties and districts (at least for all showing latitude and longitude coordinates below) may be seen in a map by clicking on "Map of all coordinates".  One property, the  Franklin B. Hough House, is further designated a National Historic Landmark.



Listings county-wide

|}

See also

 National Register of Historic Places listings in New York

References

Lewis County